The RM postcode area, also known as the Romford postcode area, is a group of twenty postcode districts in south-east England, within nine post towns. These cover parts of eastern Greater London and south-west Essex. Inward mail for the area is sorted, along with mail for the E and IG postcode areas, at the Romford Mail Centre.

In Greater London, the area covers most of the London Borough of Havering (including Romford, Hornchurch, Rainham and Upminster), the eastern part of the London Borough of Barking and Dagenham (including Dagenham itself) and a small part of the London Borough of Redbridge. In Essex, the area covers most of the Thurrock unitary district (including Grays, Purfleet, South Ockendon and Tilbury), while RM4 covers small parts of the Epping Forest District and the Borough of Brentwood.



Coverage
The approximate coverage of the postcode districts:

! RM1
| ROMFORD
| Romford, Rise Park
| Havering
|-
! RM2
| ROMFORD
| Gidea Park, Heath Park
| Havering
|-
! RM3
| ROMFORD
| Harold Wood, Harold Hill, Noak Hill, Harold Park
| Havering
|-
! RM4
| ROMFORD
| Havering-atte-Bower, Abridge, Stapleford Abbotts, Noak Hill, Navestock, Stapleford Tawney, Stapleford Aerodrome, Passingford Bridge
| Havering, Epping Forest, Brentwood
|-
! RM5
| ROMFORD
| Collier Row
| Havering, Redbridge
|-
! RM6
| ROMFORD
| Chadwell Heath, Marks Gate, Little Heath, Goodmayes (north), Hainault (South)
| Barking and Dagenham, Redbridge, Havering
|-
! RM7
| ROMFORD
| Rush Green, Mawneys, Romford
| Havering
|-
! RM8
| DAGENHAM
| Dagenham, Becontree, Becontree Heath, Chadwell Heath (south)
| Barking and Dagenham, Redbridge
|-
! RM9
| DAGENHAM
| Dagenham, Becontree Castle Green, Beam Park (west)
| Barking and Dagenham, Redbridge, Havering
|-
! RM10
| DAGENHAM
| Dagenham, Becontree
| Barking and Dagenham
|-
! RM11
| HORNCHURCH
| Hornchurch, Emerson Park, Ardleigh Green
| Havering
|-
! RM12
| HORNCHURCH
| Hornchurch, Elm Park
| Havering
|-
! RM13
| RAINHAM
| Rainham, South Hornchurch, Wennington, Hornchurch Marshes, Beam Park (east)
| Havering
|-
! RM14
| UPMINSTER
| Upminster, Cranham, North Ockendon, Bulphan
| Havering, Thurrock
|-
! RM15
| 
| South Ockendon, Aveley
| Thurrock, Havering
|-
! RM16
| GRAYS
| Chafford Hundred, Chadwell St Mary, North Stifford, Orsett
| Thurrock
|-
! RM17
| GRAYS
| Grays, Badgers Dene
| Thurrock
|-
! RM18
| TILBURY
| Tilbury, East Tilbury, West Tilbury
| Thurrock
|-
! RM19
| PURFLEET
| Purfleet
| Thurrock
|-
! RM20
| GRAYS
| West Thurrock, South Stifford, Lakeside Shopping Centre
| Thurrock
|}

Map

See also
Postcode Address File
List of postcode areas in the United Kingdom

References

External links
Royal Mail's Postcode Address File
A quick introduction to Royal Mail's Postcode Address File (PAF)

Postcode areas covering London
Postcode areas covering the East of England
Media and communications in the London Borough of Havering
Media and communications in the London Borough of Barking and Dagenham
Thurrock
Epping Forest District